Anniversary Bluff is a rock cliff  west of the Birthday Bluffs on the south side of Mason Spur, Hillary Coast, Ross Dependency. The name was suggested by geologist Anne C. Wright, Department of Geoscience, New Mexico Institute of Mining and Technology, Socorro, whose field party visited the bluff on November 29, 1983, her parents' wedding anniversary.

References 

Cliffs of the Ross Dependency
Hillary Coast